Andrei Kirdyashov is a Russian professional ice hockey coach.

Coaching career
1998-2001 Neftyanik Almetyevsk - assistant coach
2001-2008 Neftyanik Almetyevsk - head coach
2008-2010 Yuzhny Ural Orsk - head coach
2010-2011 Krylya Sovetov Moscow - head coach
2011-2013 HC Saryarka - head coach

References

1966 births
Living people
Russian ice hockey coaches